Arnolds Indriksons (20 August 1893 – 27 June 1941) was a Latvian middle-distance runner. He competed in the men's 1500 metres at the 1912 Summer Olympics, representing the Russian Empire.

Personal life
Indriksons served as a captain in the Imperial Russian Army and was wounded once during the First World War and twice during the Russian Civil War. During his service, he was awarded the third and fourth classes of the Order of St. Anna, the Order of St. Stanislaus, and the fourth class of the Order of St. George. In September 1940, after the occupation of Latvia by Soviet forces, Indrikson was arrested and held at Butyrka prison. He was executed by shooting on 27 June 1941.

References

1893 births
1941 deaths
Athletes (track and field) at the 1912 Summer Olympics
Latvian male middle-distance runners
Olympic athletes of Russia
Athletes from Riga
Russian military personnel of World War I
Imperial Russian Army personnel
Recipients of the Order of St. Anna, 3rd class
Recipients of the Order of St. Anna, 4th class
Recipients of the Order of Saint Stanislaus (Russian)
Recipients of the Order of St. George of the Fourth Degree
Latvian people executed by the Soviet Union
People executed by the Soviet Union by firearm